Yerevan TV Tower (Yerevani herustaashtarak) is a  high lattice tower built in 1977 on Nork Hill near downtown Yerevan, Armenia. It is the tallest structure in the Caucasus, fourth-tallest tower in Western Asia (The Milad Tower in Tehran being the tallest), sixth-tallest free-standing lattice tower and thirty-eighth-tallest tower in the world.

Construction
In the late 1960s it was decided to replace the -high TV tower in Yerevan due to the insufficient capacity of the latter.

The preparatory work on Yerevan TV tower and Tbilisi Tower, which also needed replacement, started simultaneously at the Ukrainian Institute for Steel Structures. The project leaders were Isaak Zatulovsky, Anatoli Perelmuter, Mark Grinberg, Yuri Shevernitsky, and Boris But. Tbilisi and Yerevan were the first among the Soviet capitals where towers were built. The same group later worked on the project of Kyiv TV Tower though it was finished earlier than in Yerevan). Tbilisi Tower is lower, lighter and slightly tilted compared to Yerevan Tower.

Construction started in 1974 and finished 3 years later. The steel was shipped from Rustavi Metallurgical Plant in Georgia.

The old tower was moved to Leninakan, current Gyumri, where it is still functional today.

Structure
The structure of the TV tower in Yerevan is virtually divided into three parts: base, body, and antenna.

The base is a truss-steel tetrahedron that at the height of 71 metres becomes a closed-platform observation deck and technical offices. On the roof of this lower-tower basket are radio antennas. The triangular truss-steel structure continues to the height of 137 metres where a two-storey 18-metre structure in the shape of an inverted-truncated cone is situated. The lattice grid structure continues another 30 meters.

In the centre of this structure there is a concrete vertical pipe structure with a diameter of 4.2 metres, in which, among other things, the lift-shaft is hidden. The pipe projecting from the basement continues as an antenna carrier. This form was widespread in the Soviet Union with steel towers. For example, the Kyiv TV Tower and the Saint Petersburg TV Tower follow this construction principle.

The antenna carrier tapers (diameter per section: 4 meters, 3 meters, 2.6 meters, 1.72 meters and 0.75 meters) between five maintenance bridges to the top. The entire steel structure is painted white and international orange to comply with air safety regulations (similar to the Tokyo Tower and the Tbilisi TV Tower).

The weight of the structure is 1900 tonnes and the basement is 1170 metres above the sea level.

Broadcasting History

Installation of the tower in 1977 allowed to receive a wide variety  of programs from the Moscow Central television, as well as from other Soviet Union republics. In those years the average daily length of programs broadcast by Armenian television reached twelve hours, of which two-and-a-half hours in color, including four hours and thirty-five minutes of their own programming. Ninety-six percent of the population watched the first program. In 1978 it became possible to also receive the fourth channel of the Central television in Armenia In 1978 the programs watched were news (25%), music (23%), educational (13%), pre-adult entertainment (14.5%), political (9%) and military (6%), sport (4%), movies (3.5%) and others.

By 1978, the number of TV sets reached 500 000, of which 100 000 were color. Armenian SSR was the second in the Soviet Union with the popularization of TV. The length of TV programs per day reached 19 hours. About 50% of the programs were in color and 70% were recorded. In the subsequent years Armenia became the first of the republics of the Soviet Union by the percentage of the TV audience and the volume of programs.

See also 
 Lattice tower
 List of tallest towers in the world
 List of tallest freestanding structures in the world
 List of tallest freestanding steel structures

References

External links

Background info from the official site of Armenian Public Television
Radiomap.eu/Am - Radio stations in Armenia
Armenian TV Online

Towers completed in 1977
Buildings and structures in Yerevan
Radio masts and towers
Towers built in the Soviet Union
Towers in Armenia
Lattice towers